Sophie Cunningham may refer to:
 Sophie Cunningham (writer)
 Sophie Cunningham (basketball)